Do Disturb is the first mini-album by South Korean musician and CNBLUE member Jung Yong-hwa. It was released on July 19, 2017, under FNC Entertainment. Its title was inspired by a "do not disturb" door hanger. Consisting of dance music tracks and balladry, the record sees a sonic shift from Jung's previous music with his band and as a solo artist.

Following a series of photo and video teasers, Do Disturb and its lead single "That Girl" were concurrently released. The mini-album peaked at number three on South Korea's national Gaon Album Chart.

Background and recording
Jung began crafting the record in March 2017. In midst of a break while on tour, Jung hung a "do not disturb" door hanger in front of his hotel room, inspiring the title of the record.

Recording and mixing for Do Disturb took place in Seoul at the FNC Entertainment Studio; it was mastered at 821 Sound Mastering.

Music structure
A pop album, Do Disturb compromises various genres in the record, distinguishing itself from Jung's previous work with CNBLUE and his solo work. The first half of the mini-album consists of dance music, with the second half containing "slow-paced emotional" songs. "That Girl" is a dance-pop song with a "funky sound". "Closer" is a light medium tempo song. In the lyrics, the narrator "asks his love to stick by his side". Jung described it as the "sweet" song on the record; the chorus was initially written in English, but was later translated to Korean. "Password" is an "addictive" deep house track. His first attempt at the genre, he described as a "party" song with elements of pop music which fixates around "repetitive" hooks and lyrics.

"Navigation" is a "calm" melody which consists of piano and strings. Set in medium-tempo, the song opens with the sound of ocean waves. It is a "lyrical" song which was inspired by his "poor sense of direction". The lyrics hint as "social isolation", but also intends to "cheer up the listener". He noted that "dreams and goals" help him "navigate" his life, and feels "lost" without them. "Not Anymore" is a R&B-pop ballad which serves homage to the sound and lyricism of the 1990s by following the melodic progression and the implementation of a synthesizer common during that time period. Jung co-wrote the song with a keyboardist, which whom he worked with on his first solo concert tour; Jeon Geun-hwa provides vocals for the chorus. It deals with the mourning of a breakup. The closing track "Lost in Time" is a "traditional" ballad with a "tranquil" melody. Jung utilized a similar chord progression to "Last Leaf" from his debut studio album One Fine Day (2015), calling it an "extension" of the song. It "captures the sadness" of the narrator seeking to forget his former lover.

Artwork concept and packaging
Do Disturb was released in two editions. The standard version cover of the mini-album depicts Jung in black-and-white monochrome, contrasted against colorful tropical plants in the form of decalcomania in order to emit a summery aura. Not part of the original design, the decalcomania was inspired by a trip Jung took to Hawaii, where he "fell in love with the place". Shot in the Hongdae, Seoul, Jung collaborated with a photographer of Arena Korea magazine for the album photography. It showcases him wearing a colored, patterned Hawaiian shirt. Formed in the shape of a book, its contents include a 96-page photo booklet, a poster, and one random selfie photo card.

Designed and hand-drawn by Jung, the special version cover depicts a red door hanger affixed with a pupil, signifying that "the eye is watching". It is set against a golden backdrop of the logo of his "JYH" initials. The album photography shows Jung donning white apparel as sun rays shimmer through curtains, producing a "relaxed" environment. He sought to take photos of "close-up shots of my body parts". The packaging includes 24-page photo booklet, a poster, and one random selfie photo card.

Release and promotion
The release of the record was first announced on June 19, 2017. Beginning on July 10, FNC Entertainment released a series of teasers to promote Do Disturb. The record company launched a teaser site entitled Summer Night Beginning. On the following day, a concept trailer for the lead the song was unveiled. A series of photo teasers were uploaded for the standard and special versions between July 12–13, respectively. A highlight medley for the record and art spoiler were released on the subsequent day. On July 17, a music video trailer for "That Girl" was released. Do Disturb and the music video for "That Girl" featuring Loco was concurrently released on July 19.

On July 21, Jung began promoting "That Girl" by performing the song on weekly music chart shows. In addition to the lead single, he also performed "Lost in Time" on Mnet's M Countdown, Korean Broadcasting System's (KBS) Music Bank, Munhwa Broadcasting Corporation's (MBC) Show! Music Core, Seoul Broadcasting System's (SBS) Inkigayo, and MBC Music's Show Champion.

Commercial performance
On the chart dated July 16–22, 2017, Do Disturb debuted at number three on South Korea's national Gaon Album Chart. Spending two consecutive weeks at its peak, the mini-album sold 58,982 copies domestically by the end of the month. It ranked at number 12 on Billboard magazine's World Albums Chart. In Japan, the mini-album debuted at number 27 on the weekly Oricon Albums Chart, selling 2,861 copies in its first week. It has sold 6,118 copies in the country since its release.

Critical reception
Writing for online magazine IZM, Jung Min-jae rated Do Disturb three and a half stars out of five, describing Jung's "musical caliber" is "highly commendable". He complimented the "well-made tracks" and the "delightfully diverse genres" included on the record. He mused, "it is clear that he has solidified his competitiveness as a soloist through making this superb pop album". However, he criticized the song lyrics for its shortcomings, pointing out that the "shallow stories don't imbue much depth into one's listening, and one-dimensional metaphors don't amount to repeated enjoyment." Overall, he deemed Do Disturb as satisfying mini-album.

Do Disturb earned Jung a nomination for the Golden Disc Album Award at the 32nd Golden Disc Awards.

Track listing

Personnel
Credits adapted from the album's liner notes.

 Jung Yong-hwa – lyricist, composer, background vocalist
 Carl Altino – composer
 An Deok-gi – making photo
 Bae Hun-jik – recording engineer
 Baek Sang-woo – artist management
 Choi Eun-jeong – artist management
 Choi Yong-bin – photography
 Choi Yun-jin – A&R, publishing
 Jarah Gibson – composer, background vocalist
 Han Ho – artist management
 Han Seong-ho – executive producer
 Han Seong-jun – artist management
 Han Seung-hun – producer
 Hong Ji-su – artist management
 Im Ji-yeon – A&R, media planning
 Jang Bit-na – assistant stylist
 Jeon Geun-hwa – background vocalist
 Jo Seong-wan – supervisor
 Jung Bo-yeong – makeup
 Jung Eun-bi – international business
 Jung Eun-gyeong – customer relationship management
 Jung Eun-ji – contents planning, marketing
 Jung Go-eun – customer relationship management
 Jung Jae-pil – guitar
 Jung Jin-wook – arranger
 Jung Yu-jin – customer relationship management
 Kang Jong-hyeok – artist management
 Kim Chang-rak – arranger, producer
 Kim Ha-yeon – media planning
 Kim Hang-a – art direction, design
 Kim Hye-rim – artist management
 Kim Ji-hye – contents planning, marketing
 Kim Ji-yu – customer relationship management
 Kim Ji-yun – art direction, design
 Kim Jin-a – contents planning, marketing
 Kim Na-yeon – visual communication
 Kim Seong-han – contents planning, marketing
 Kim Se-yong – making photo
 Kim Su-hee – contents planning, marketing
 Kim Tae-hyeok – artist management

 Kim Ye-jin – international business
 Kim Yeong-seon – contents planning, marketing
 Kim Yong-seup – media planning
 Kim Yong-won – artist management
 Kim Yu-jin – international business, customer relationship management, art direction, design
 Ryu Hae-rang – MCS
 Kwon Nam-woo – mastering engineer
 Kwon Woo-mi – A&R
 Lee Ga-eun – international business
 Lee Ga-yeong – international business
 Lee Hae-yeong – publishing
 Lee Hye-yeong – stylist
 Lee Jeong-woo – bass
 Lee Ji-yeong – media planning
 Lee Seung-ho – artist management
 Lee Yu-jin – mixing engineer
 Loco – lyricist
 Ma Se-bin – international business
 Park Jeong-min – recording engineer, mixing engineer
 Park Mi-hyeong – hair
 Park Sang-hyeon – artist management
 Park So-hyeon – artist management
 Pyo Jin-hee – customer relationship management
 Justin Reinstein – composer, arranger
 Ryu Min-a – MCS
 Seo Seok-bin – visual communication
 Seong Jong-jin – artist management
 Seong Sang-hyeon – international business
 Song Yun-ho – MCS
 TJ Routon – composer, arranger
 Peter Wallevik – composer
 Woo Hyeon-sik – artist management
 Yang Hee-won – artist management
 Yeo Hwan-gu – artist management
 Yoo Sun-ho – media planning
 Yoon Hye-jin – art direction, design
 Yoon Hyeon-jun – visual communication
 Yoon Je-yun – artist management
 Yoon Seul-gi – recording engineer

Charts

Sales

References

External links

2017 EPs
Albums produced by Jung Yong-hwa
FNC Entertainment EPs
Jung Yong-hwa EPs
Korean-language EPs